Meandrina is a genus of colonial stony coral in the family Meandrinidae. Corals in this genus form massive hemispherical heads or have large flat plates and can grow to a metre (yard) across. Sometimes it is referred to as brain coral.

Species
The World Register of Marine Species lists the following species:
 Meandrina brasiliensis (Milne Edwards & Haime, 1848)
 Meandrina danae (Milne Edwards & Haime, 1848)
 Meandrina jacksoni Weil & Pinzón, 2011
 Meandrina meandrites (Linnaeus, 1758)
 †Meandrina polygonalis Catullo, 1856

References

Scleractinia genera
Meandrinidae
Taxa named by Jean-Baptiste Lamarck